Kim Hwang-ho (born August 15, 1954) is a Korean football goalkeeper who played for South Korea in the 1980 Asian Cup. He also played for Auto Insurance and Korean Navy.

International record

References

External links

South Korean footballers
South Korea international footballers
1980 AFC Asian Cup players
1954 births
Living people
Kyung Hee University alumni
Association football goalkeepers